The TT Women's League Football, or WoLF is the top level of the women's football system in Trinidad and Tobago. Contested by 10 clubs. WoLF is also the body responsible for the development of the women's game on Trinidad and Tobago.

Teams
 Club Sando (San Fernando) 
 St Augustine (Unknown) 
 Trincity Nationals (Unknown) 
 QPCC (Unknown) 
 Defence Force (Unknown)  
 Police (Unknown)
 UTT (Unknown)
 Jewels (Unknown) 
 Tobago Chicas (Unknown)
 St Augustine Juniors (Unknown)

Champions
2019: Club Sando

References

External links
Trinidad and Tobago Women 2019 RSSSF
WoLF Official

Women's football in Trinidad and Tobago